Neurexophilin-1 is a protein that in humans is encoded by the NXPH1 gene.

This gene is a member of the neurexophilin family and encodes a secreted protein with a variable N-terminal domain, a highly conserved, N-glycosylated central domain, a short linker region, and a cysteine-rich C-terminal domain. This protein forms a very tight complex with alpha neurexins, a group of proteins that promote adhesion between dendrites and axons.

References

Further reading